The 2010–11 Kansas State Wildcats men's basketball team represented Kansas State University in the 2010-11 NCAA Division I men's basketball season. The head coach was Frank Martin, who was serving his 4th year at the helm of the Wildcats. The team played its home games in Bramlage Coliseum in Manhattan, Kansas.  Kansas State is a member of the Big 12 Conference.  The Wildcats began conference play with a trip to Stillwater, Oklahoma, facing the Oklahoma State Cowboys and finished conference play at home against Iowa State Cyclones. The team finished with a 10–6 record, placing 4th. They lost in Big 12 Tournament Quarterfinals to Colorado Buffaloes, 87–75, and participated in the 2011 NCAA Division I men's basketball tournament. In NCAA tournament, they beat Utah State, 73–68 in second round, and lost to Wisconsin, 70–65 in third round.

Preseason
The team played their home games at the Bramlage Coliseum, which has a capacity of 12,528. They are in their 15th season as a member of the Big 12 Conference. Coming back from their 2009–10 season, they compiled a record of 28–8 and advanced to the Elite Eight of the 2010 NCAA Division I men's basketball tournament.

However, Kansas State lost star player Denis Clemente to graduation, whom Blue Ribbon Yearbook called their "emotional leader". Clemente was the team's second leading scorer at 16.6 points per game, and led the team in assists, dishing out 4.2 per game. Bench players Luis Colon and Chris Merriewether, a former walk-on, also graduated. In addition, starting forward Dominique Sutton, known for his defensive capabilities, transferred to North Carolina Central University to be closer to his family. In 2009–10, he averaged 7.2 points and 5.8 rebounds per game.

Despite the losses, the Wildcats were regarded as one of the best teams coming into the 2010–11 season. The preseason ESPN/USA Today Coaches Poll, released on October 21, had them as the #3 team in NCAA Division I.

Recruiting
The following is a list of the recruits for the 2010–2011 season.

Schedule

|-
!colspan=9| Exhibition

|-
!colspan=9| Regular Season

|-
!colspan=9| 2011 Big 12 men's basketball tournament

|-
!colspan=9| 2011 NCAA Division I men's basketball tournament

Rankings

Roster 

During the season, junior Freddy Asprilla and sophomore Wally Judge left the team and do not appear on the roster.

See also
2011 NCAA Division I men's basketball tournament
2011 Big 12 men's basketball tournament
2010-11 NCAA Division I men's basketball season
2010-11 NCAA Division I men's basketball rankings
List of NCAA Division I institutions

References

Kansas State
Kansas State Wildcats men's basketball seasons
Kansas State
Kansas State Wildcats men's basketball
Kansas State Wildcats men's basketball